Coach Trip 1 was the first series of Coach Trip (a Channel 4 programme) that was filmed from April to June 2004 and aired from 7 March to 19 April 2005. The trip went through several European countries. Chris Groombridge was the driver for the only time, Brendan Sheerin was the tour guide, Andy Love was narrator and the registration was T100 MTT.

Contestants

Voting History

Notes

 There was no need for Joanne & Steph to cast their vote, as they had already been voted off by the other couples.

 Due to 3 of the couples leaving the coach that day, Brendan cancelled the vote.

 Three couples walked on Day 17 of the trip:Angela & Eden walked after a slight delay the previous night.Bob & Pasquale walked after Pete's aggressive behaviour the previous night.Barbara & Pete walked after a fight the previous night but Brendan later claimed they would have been disqualified for nounal abuse.

 Alan & Carol left the coach as Alan was hospitalised with a collapsed lung.

 Max & Tom were removed with a red card on Day 19 for bad behaviour throughout the trip and refusing to continue but as noted given in later series.

The trip by day

References

Coach Trip series
Television shows set in Austria
Television shows set in Belgium
Television shows set in France
Television shows set in Germany
Television shows set in Italy
Television shows set in Slovenia
Television shows set in Spain
Television shows set in the Netherlands